Palm Beach State College is a public college in Lake Worth, Florida.  It is part of the Florida College System.

Palm Beach State College enrolls nearly 27,000 students in over 100 programs of study including bachelor of applied science, associate in arts and associate in science degree programs, and short-term certificates, as well as continuing education and avocational courses. In 2009, the college started its first baccalaureate program, a Bachelor of Applied Science degree in Supervision & Management.

History 
Palm Beach State College was founded in 1933 as Palm Beach Junior College  and was the first public junior college in the state of Florida. The Old Palm Beach Junior College Building is listed on the National Register of Historic Places.

The college's first classes were held at Palm Beach High School in West Palm Beach. County school superintendent Joe Youngblood and Howell Watkins, principal of Palm Beach High School, who became the college's first dean, were instrumental in opening the college. The college's initial goal was to provide additional training to local high school graduates who were unable to find jobs during the Great Depression.

In 1948, Palm Beach Junior College moved to Morrison Field, a deactivated Army Air Force base, which is now Palm Beach International Airport. In 1951, the college relocated to the Lake Park Town Hall. Due to the limited availability of space at the town hall, the college had to lay off faculty and staff and cut enrollment to 200 students. During this period, Palm Beach Junior College was known as "the little orphan college." In 1955, the Palm Beach County Commission gave the college  in Lake Worth, and the state legislature passed a bill providing over $1,000,000 for construction at this site. The college moved to this location, which remains its main campus, in the fall of 1956.

In 1965, Palm Beach Junior College merged with Roosevelt Junior College, which was established in 1958 under President Britton Sayles to serve African American students. In 1968, control over the college passed from the Palm Beach County school district to a board of trustees. In 1978, the college opened its Belle Glade campus. The Palm Beach Gardens campus opened in 1982. In 1983, the college opened a campus adjacent to Florida Atlantic University in Boca Raton. In 1988, the college's board of trustees changed the college's name to Palm Beach Community College.

The District Board of Trustees approved a resolution in June 2009 stating that the college's name should change in light of offering baccalaureate degrees. On September 8, 2009, the Board approved changing the name to Palm Beach State College. The new name officially took effect on January 12, 2010.

Organization 
The college is part of the Florida College System.

Campus 

Palm Beach State College's main campus is located in Palm Beach County, Florida. In addition to the Lake Worth campus, the largest (114 acre/51 building complex) and longest established campus (1956), the college also serves students at full-service locations in Belle Glade (1978), Palm Beach Gardens (1982), Boca Raton (1983) and Loxahatchee Groves (2017).

Academics 
Palm Beach State College enrolls nearly 26,666 students in over 100 programs of study including bachelor of applied science, associate in arts and associate in science degree programs, and short-term certificates.

Enrollment

The most popular program of study is the associate in arts degree. Among associate in science degrees, the nursing program has the highest enrollment and number of graduates. In August 2009, the college started its first baccalaureate program, a Bachelor of Applied Science degree in Supervision & Management. Palm Beach State now offers three bachelor's degrees in six tracks. Information Management was added in 2011 and Nursing in 2012.

The college is accredited by the Southern Association of Colleges and Schools Commission on Colleges to award the Bachelor of Science, Bachelor of Applied Science, Associate in Arts, Associate in Science and Associate in Applied Science degrees.

The Palm Beach State College truck technology program was ranked as the best in the United States in 2015.

Athletics 
The college athletics teams, which are nicknamed the Panthers, compete in the Southern Conference of the Florida State College Activities Association, a body of the National Junior College Athletic Association Region 8. In 2013, the Panther baseball team were runners up at the Alpine Bank Junior College World Series. The Panthers lost 7-3 in the National Championship Game to Central Alabama Community College.

Notable people

Administrators and faculty
Historical administrators and faculty of the college include names foundational to the history of education in Palm Beach County and Florida, as evident on buildings throughout the campus and on public schools across the county bearing their names.

In 1933, then-county school superintendent Joe A. Youngblood and then-Palm Beach High School principal Howell L. Watkins founded Palm Beach Junior College with volunteer teachers and 45 students.

More names of that ilk include the college's first and second presidents, John I. Leonard (from 1936 to 1958) and Harold C. Manor (from 1958 to 1978) respectively, and Britton G. Sayles, president and founder of Roosevelt Junior College (from 1958 to 1965). And the school's third and fourth presidents, Edward M. Eissey (from 1979 to 1997) and Dennis P. Gallon (from 1997 to 2015).

Notable faculty names include Watson B Duncan III of whom it was written: "the man who taught myth was indeed mythological". In addition to inspiring students and seeing the new theater named for him, between 1948 and 1991, Duncan taught English and speech, and was chair of the communications department.

Alumni

Among the most notable alumni of Palm Beach State College are actor Burt Reynolds, Jesper Parnevik who currently plays on the PGA Tour, soap opera actress Deidre Hall, Yolanda Griffith, an Olympic Gold Medalist and Professional Basketball Player with the WNBA, and James L. Wattenbarger who was the Architect of the Florida Community College system.

 Ross Baumgarten, professional baseball player
 Dante Bichette, professional baseball player
 Wilson G. Bradshaw, President of Florida Gulf Coast University
 Mark Brownson, professional baseball player
 Crystl Bustos, Olympic gold medalist in softball
 William Calley, convicted war criminal (did not graduate)
 Tony Cruz, professional baseball player
 Paul Dicken, professional baseball player
 Tal Erel, Israel National Baseball Team player
 Gar Finnvold, professional baseball player
 Mark Foley, former U.S. Representative
 Joe Grahe, professional baseball player
 Ken Green, professional golfer
 Yolanda Griffith, Olympic gold medalist and professional basketball player
 Deidre Hall, television actress
 David Manning, professional baseball player
 Monte Markham, television and movie actor
 Andy McGaffigan, professional baseball player
 Bobby Muñoz, professional baseball player
 Randy O'Neal, professional baseball player
 Jesper Parnevik, professional golfer
 Brad Peacock, professional baseball player
 Judge Reinhold, television and movie actor
 Sammis Reyes, Chilean basketball and American football player
 Burt Reynolds, television and movie actor
 Antoan Richardson, professional baseball player and coach
 Lucia St. Clair Robson, historical novelist
 Kevin Siegrist, professional player
 Kim Swan, politician and leader of the opposition party in Bermuda
 Robby Thompson, professional baseball player
 James L. Wattenbarger, architect of the Florida Community College system
 Charles Willeford, writer
 Gareth Williams, television and movie actor
 Jeff Wilpon, former Chief Operating Officer of the New York Mets

See also

 List of colleges and universities in Florida
 List of community colleges

References

External links

 
Buildings and structures in Lake Worth Beach, Florida
Educational institutions established in 1933
Florida College System
Universities and colleges accredited by the Southern Association of Colleges and Schools
Universities and colleges in Palm Beach County, Florida
NJCAA athletics
1933 establishments in Florida